Hib-Tone is an American recording label, based in Atlanta, Georgia, founded by Jonny Hibbert, a law student at Woodrow Wilson College of Law, in 1981. The label has released eight records, including two full-length albums by the bands Design and RF and the Radar Angels. The most recent release is by singer-songwriter Noёl Hamilton.

The label is notable because it released R.E.M.'s debut single "Radio Free Europe" and its B-side "Sitting Still".  "Radio Free Europe" was re-recorded and released on the band's first full-length album, Murmur. "Sitting Still" was remixed by Mitch Easter and also included on Murmur. The mix produced by Hibbert and engineered by Easter of the "Hib-Tone" version of "Radio Free Europe" was subsequently released on R.E.M.'s 1988 compilation album Eponymous. The original Hibbert mixes of both songs were collected on 2006's And I Feel Fine... The Best of the I.R.S Years 1982–1987.

Singles
R.E.M. – "Radio Free Europe"/"Sitting Still" (1981)
The Throbs – "Just One Dance"/"Girl Don't Waste Your Tears" (1981)
Harold Kelling – "Jezebel"/"Harlem Nocturne" (1981)
Three Hits – "Pressure Dome"/"Numbers" (1985)

EPs
The Neuz – Understand? 7" (1982)
Design – Dancing in a Trance 12" (1984)

Albums
R.F. & The Radar Angels – Pictures of Linda (1982)

See also
List of record labels

References

External links
Discogs.com page for Hib-Tone Records

Alternative rock record labels
American record labels
Companies based in Atlanta
Record labels disestablished in 1985
Record labels established in 1981
R.E.M.
1981 establishments in Georgia (U.S. state)
1985 disestablishments in the United States